Justice Secretary can refer to:

 Cabinet Secretary for Justice, Scotland
 Secretary for Justice, Hong Kong
 Secretary of Justice (Philippines)
 Secretary of State for Justice, United Kingdom

See also 
 Justice minister